Yuva Puraskar relates to books published by an author of the age of 35 and below as on January 1 of the year of the award. This is a list of Nepali writers who received the award given by Sahitya Akademi.

Recipients 
Following are the recipients:

See also 

 List of Sahitya Akademi Award winners for Nepali
 Yuva Puraskar

References 

Indian literary awards
Awards established in 2011
2011 establishments in India
Yuva Puraskar winners
Nepali literary institutions
Nepali language